Socialist Studies may refer to:

Socialist Studies (1981), a series of publications by the Socialist Labor Party
Socialist Studies (1989), a quarterly Marxist periodical and the London-based group which publishes it
Socialist Studies (book series), an academic book series published annually by the Society for Socialist Studies
Socialist Studies (Committee on Socialist Studies journal), the journal of the Committee on Socialist Studies
Socialist Studies (Society for Socialist Studies journal), a peer-reviewed, interdisciplinary journal published by the Society for Socialist Studies
Socialist Studies, a quarterly magazine published by the United Socialist Party (UK)
Socialist Studies Bulletin, an interdisciplinary journal published by the Society for Socialist Studies